This is a list of 166 genera in Diapheromeridae, a family of walkingsticks in the order Phasmatodea.

Diapheromeridae genera

 Acacus  c g
 Acanthoderus  c g
 Acanthophasma  c g
 Adelungella  c g
 Alienobostra  c g
 Anarchodes  c g
 Anasceles  c g
 Andropromachus  c g
 Asceles  c g
 Aschiphasmodes  c g
 Asteliaphasma  c g
 Asystata  c g
 Austrosipyloidea  c g
 Bacteria  c g
 Bactricia  c g
 Bactrododema  c g
 Bostra  c g
 Brevinecroscia  c g
 Brockphasma  c g
 Burria  c g
 Calvisia  c g
 Calynda  c g
 Candovia  c g
 Capuyanus  c g
 Caribbiopheromera  c g
 Caudasceles  c g
 Centrophasma  c g
 Channia  c g
 Charmides  c g
 Cheniphasma  c g
 Clonaria  c g
 Clonistria  c g
 Cornicandovia  c g
 Dematobactron  c g
 Diacanthoidea  c g
 Diangelus  c g
 Diapheromera Gray, 1835 i c g b
 Diardia  c g
 Diesbachia  c g
 Dubiophasma  c g
 Dyme  c g
 Eurynecroscia  c g
 Exocnophila  c g
 Galactea  c g
 Gargantuoidea  c g
 Gharianus  c g
 Globocalynda  c g
 Globocrania  c g
 Gratidiinilobus  c g
 Hemipachymorpha  c g
 Hemiplasta  c g
 Hemisosibia  c g
 Hennemannia  c g
 Huananphasma  c g
 Labanphasma  c g
 Laciniobethra  c g
 Laciphorus  c g
 Ladakhomorpha  c g
 Laevediacantha  c g
 Lamachodes  c g
 Leptynia  c g
 Libethra  c g
 Libethroidea  c g
 Linocerus  c g
 Litosermyle  c g
 Lobolibethra  c g
 Lobonecroscia  c g
 Lopaphus  c g
 Loxopsis  c g
 Macellina  c g
 Macrocercius  c g
 Maculonecroscia  c g
 Malandella  c g
 Manomera Rehn & Hebard, 1907 i c g b
 Maransis  c g
 Marmessoidea  c g
 Megaphasma Caudell, 1903 i c g b
 Meionecroscia  c g
 Mesaner  c g
 Micadina  c g
 Micrarchus  c g
 Miniphasma  c g
 Moritasgus  c g
 Nanolibethra  c g
 Necroscia  c g
 Neoasceles  c g
 Neoclides  c g
 Neohirasea  c g
 Neonescicroa  c g
 Neoqiongphasma  c g
 Neososibia  c g
 Niveaphasma  c g
 Notaspinius  c g
 Ocnophila  c g
 Ocnophiloidea  c g
 Oncotophasma  c g
 Oreophoetes  c g
 Oreophoetophasma  c g
 Orthonecroscia  c g
 Orthostheneboea  c g
 Orxines  c g
 Otraleus  c g
 Ovacephala  c g
 Oxyartes  c g
 Pachymorpha  c g
 Pachyscia  c g
 Parabacillus Caudell, 1903 i c g
 Paracalynda  c g
 Paraclonistria  c g
 Paradiacantha  c g
 Paragongylopus  c g
 Paraloxopsis  c g
 Paramenexenus  c g
 Paranecroscia  c g
 Paraphanocles  c g
 Paraprosceles  c g
 Parasinophasma  c g
 Parasipyloidea  c g
 Parasosibia  c g
 Parastheneboea  c g
 Parocnophila  c g
 Paroxyartes  c g
 Phaenopharos  c g
 Phamartes  c g
 Phanocles  c g
 Phanoclocrania  c g
 Phanocloidea  c g
 Phantasca  c g
 Phthoa  c g
 Pijnackeria  c g
 Planososibia  c g
 Platysosibia  c g
 Pomposa  c g
 Pseudobactricia  c g
 Pseudocentema  c g
 Pseudoclonistria  c g
 Pseudodiacantha  c g
 Pseudoneoclides  c g
 Pseudoparamenexenus  c g
 Pseudopromachus  c g
 Pseudosermyle Caudell, 1903 i c g b
 Pterolibethra  c g
 Qiongphasma  c g
 Rhamphosipyloidea  c g
 Sabahphasma  c g
 Sceptrophasma  c g
 Scionecra  c g
 Septopenna  c g
 Sermyle Stål, 1875 i c g b
 Singaporoidea  c g
 Sinophasma  c g
 Sipyloidea  c g
 Sosibia  c g
 Spinohirasea  c g
 Spinopeplus  c g
 Spinosipyloidea  c g
 Spinotectarchus  c g
 Syringodes  c g
 Tagesoidea  c g
 Tectarchus  c g
 Thrasyllus  c g
 Trachythorax  c g
 Trychopeplus  c g
 Varieganecroscia  c g
 Zangphasma  c g
 Zehntneria  c g

Data sources: i = ITIS, c = Catalogue of Life, g = GBIF, b = Bugguide.net

References

Lists of insect genera
Phasmatodea